LEWP may refer to:

Leading Edge Word Processor, a word processing program distributed with Leading Edge computers in the 1980s.
Line echo wave pattern, a weather radar formation
Lower Esopus Watershed Partnership, a New York conservation coalition